Non-contact ultrasound (NCU) is a method of non-destructive testing where ultrasound is generated and used to test materials without the generating sensor making direct or indirect contact with the test material or test subject. Historically this has been difficult to do, as a typical transducer is very inefficient in air. Therefore, most conventional ultrasound methods require the use of some type of acoustic coupling medium in order to efficiently transmit the energy from the sensor to the test material. Couplant materials can range from gels or jets of water to direct solder bonds. However, in non-contact ultrasound, ambient air is the only acoustic coupling medium.

An electromagnetic acoustic transducer (EMAT), is a type of non-contact ultrasound that generates an ultrasonic pulse which reflects off the sample and induces an electric current in the receiver. This is interpreted by software and provides clues about the internal structure of the sample such as cracks or faults.

Research is continuing to improve traditional transducers by applying different plastics, elastomers, and other materials. The sensitivity of these devices continues to improve; a newly developed piezoelectric transducer can produce frequencies in the MHz that can easily propagate through even high acoustic impedance materials such as steel and dense ceramics.

Non-contact ultrasound allows some materials to be inspected which otherwise can't be inspected due to fear of contamination from couplants or water. In general non-contact ultrasound would facilitate testing of materials or components that are continuously rolled on a production line, in extremely hot environments, coated, oxidized, or otherwise difficult to physically contact. Methods for potential medical use are also being investigated

Laser ultrasonics is another method of non-contact ultrasound.

References 

Nondestructive testing